RKB may refer to:
Reichs Kolonial Bund
Responder Knowledge Base
RKB Mainichi Broadcasting
Ro-Kyu-Bu!
Roger Keith Barrett
Rotary kelly bushing, a mechanical device used in drilling operations to rotate the drill string